Basahang Ginto  (International title: Golden Heart / ) is a 2010 Philippine television drama series broadcast by GMA Network. Based on a Philippine comic book by Mars Ravelo and the 1952 Philippine film of the same title, the series is the twentieth instalment of Sine Novela. Directed by Joel Lamangan, it stars Carla Abellana and Geoff Eigenmann. It premiered on May 24, 2010 on the network's Dramarama sa Hapon line up replacing Ina, Kasusuklaman Ba Kita?. The series concluded on September 24, 2010 with a total of 90 episodes.

Cast and characters

Lead cast
 Geoff Eigenmann as Danny Vergara
 Carla Abellana as Orang Dimarucot / Laura Leyva

Supporting cast
 Jackie Lou Blanco as Elaine Vergara
 Rita Avila as Ising Dimarucot
 Tony Mabesa as Cecilo Cortez
 Bearwin Meily as Manoro Dimarucot Sr.
 Jim Pebangco as Godofredo "Godo" Pandol
 Samantha Lopez as Lilian Gonzaga
 Kevin Santos as Rocky Vergara
 Vaness del Moral as Sylvia Villarama
 Eunice Lagusad as Angela "Gilay" Dimarucot
 Byron Ortile as Manoro "Michael" Dimarucot Jr.
 Celia Rodriguez as Marina Vergara

Recurring cast
 Aiko Melendez as Rosenda Montecillo
 Polo Ravales as Anton
 Dominic Roco as Aris
 Jhoana Marie Tan as Deedee Gonzaga
 Kaye Alipio as Nikki
 Sophia Halabi as Rachel
 Neofytos Kyriakou as Yego
 Afi Africa as Bebot
 Ruby Ruiz as Agta
 Lucho Ayala as Benjie
 Ma. Rosario Bustamante as Amy
 Marie Dionne de Guzman as Susan
 Gracie Henson as Sarah
 Anna Vicente as the mean girl
 Michelle Vito as the mean girl

Guest cast
 Toby Alejar as Wilmar Vergara
 Princess Freking as young Orang

Ratings
According to AGB Nielsen Philippines' Mega Manila household television ratings, the pilot episode of Basahang Ginto earned a 13.1% rating. While the final episode scored a 7.2% rating in Mega Manila People/Individual television ratings.

References

External links
 

2010 Philippine television series debuts
2010 Philippine television series endings
Filipino-language television shows
GMA Network drama series
Live action television shows based on films
Television shows based on comics
Television shows set in the Philippines